The 1997 America East Conference baseball tournament was held at Frawley Stadium in Wilmington, Delaware. The top six regular season finishers of the league's nine teams qualified for the double-elimination tournament. In the championship game, fifth-seeded Northeastern defeated third-seeded Vermont, 8–1, to win its second tournament championship. As a result, Northeastern received the America East's automatic bid to the 1997 NCAA Tournament.

Seeding 
The top six finishers from the regular season were seeded one through six based on conference winning percentage only. They then played in a double-elimination format. In the first round, the one and six seeds were matched up in the first game, the two and five seeds in the second, and the three and four seeds in the third.

Results

All-Tournament Team 
The following players were named to the All-Tournament Team.

Most Outstanding Player 
Northeastern first baseman Carlos Peña was named Most Outstanding Player.

References 

America East Conference Baseball Tournament
1997 America East Conference baseball season
1997 in sports in Delaware
College baseball tournaments in Delaware
Sports competitions in Wilmington, Delaware